Lazenby is a surname. Notable people with the surname include:

 Alec Lazenby (born 1927), academic 
 George Lazenby (born 1939), actor
 George Lazenby (cabinetmaker) (1807–1895)
 Roland Lazenby, American sportswriter and educator
 Simon Lazenby, TV presenter and lead presenter of Formula One for Sky Sports
 Tracy Lazenby (born 1959), former English professional rugby player
 William Lazenby (died c. 1888), English publisher of pornography